Old Malvernians F.C. is a football club based at Chelsea Training Centre in Cobham, Surrey, England. The members of the club are old boys of Malvern College, in Malvern, Worcestershire, England. They play in the Arthurian League. The team has reached the final of the Arthur Dunn Cup a record 31 times and won the cup 15 times, second only to the Old Carthusians.

History
The club was formed in 1897 and competed in the FA Amateur Cup that year, making it to the semi-finals before losing to Uxbridge 1–0.

In the 1901–02 season the club won the FA Amateur Cup, when they beat Bishop Auckland 5–1 in the final. The following season the club picked up the London Senior Cup, when they beat Clapton in the final 4–2. They also won the AFA Senior Cup in 1911.

The club became one of the founder members of the Arthurian League League, and won the Premier Division five times between 1963 and 1970.

Team colours

The club's traditional colours are those of the Old Malvernian Club: black, blue and red, however teams often play in the school colours of green and white halved shirts.

Ground

Old Malvernians play their home games at Chelsea Training Centre, 62 Stoke Road, Stoke D'Abernon, Cobham, Surrey, KT11 3PT.

Honours

League honours
Arthurian League Premier Division :
 winners (5): 1963–64, 1964–65, 1967–68, 1968–69, 1969–70
Arthurian League Division One:
 winners (1): 2007–08

Cup honours
FA Amateur Cup:
 winners (1): 1901–02
AFA Senior Cup:
 winners (1): 1910–11
London Senior Cup:
 winners (1): 1902–03
Arthur Dunn Cup :
 winners (excluding wins before 1960) (8): 1964–65, 1967–68 (shared with Old Reptonians), 1968–69, 1970–71, 1974–75, 1975–76, 1977–78, 1988–89

Former players
A list of players that have played for the club at one stage and meet one of the following criteria;
 Players that have played/managed in the football league or any foreign equivalent to this level (i.e. fully professional league).
 Players with full international caps.
 Has achieved notability in football through playing a significant role in the administration of the game.
Cuthbert Burnup
Rex Corbett 
Samuel Day 
R. E. Foster 
Joe Mears

See also
List of Old Malvernians

References

External links
Arthurian League. Arthurian League official website.
 Old Malvernians F.C. www.facebook.com

People educated at Malvern College
Football clubs in England
1897 establishments in England
Association football clubs established in 1897